The Hamlyn, later Hamlyn-Williams Baronetcy, of Clovelly Court in the County of Devon and of Edwinsford in the County of Carmarthen, was a title in the Baronetage of Great Britain. It was created on 7 July 1795 for James Hamlyn (born James Hammett), heir of his great-uncle Zachary Hamlyn (1677-1759) of Clovelly. This coat of arms was one of the many of the Hamlin/Hamelin family, and was transmitted from John de Hameline, knight of Leicester, who served under King Edward I, A. D. 1272 to 1307.

He married Arabella Williams, daughter and eventual heiress of Thomas Williams (d.1792) of Edwinsford, Llandeilo, in Carmarthenshire, himself the heir of his elder brother Sir Nicholas Williams, 1st Baronet (1681–1745) of Edwinsford. Their son, the second Baronet, assumed the additional surname of Williams in 1798. The title became extinct on the death of his son, the third Baronet, in 1861. All three Baronets represented Carmarthenshire in Parliament. Charles Hamlyn-Williams, younger son of the second Baronet, was a Rear-Admiral in the Royal Navy.

Susan Hester Hamlyn-Williams, eldest daughter of the third Baronet, inherited the family seat of Clovelly Court and married Henry Fane, who assumed the surname Hamlyn-Fane.

Hamlyn, later Hamlyn-Williams baronets, of Clovelly Court and Edwinsford (1795)
Sir James Hamlyn, 1st Baronet (1735–1811)
Sir James Hamlyn-Williams, 2nd Baronet (1765–1829)
Sir James Hamlyn-Williams, 3rd Baronet (1790–1861)

See also
Williams-Drummond baronets
Williams baronets

References

Extinct baronetcies in the Baronetage of Great Britain
1795 establishments in Great Britain